In medicine, salpingo-oophorectomy is the removal of an ovary and its Fallopian tube. This procedure is most frequently associated with prophylactic surgery in response to the discovery of a BRCA mutation, particularly those of the normally tumor suppressing  BRCA1 gene (or, with a statistically lower negative impact, those of the tumour suppressing BRCA2 gene), which can increase the risk of a woman developing ovarian cancer to as high as 65% (as high as 25% for a mutated BRCA2 gene).

See also 
 List of surgeries by type
 Oophorectomy

References

Gynecological surgery
Surgical removal procedures